The markka (alternatively mark or Finnmark; ; ; sign: Mk; ISO code: FIM) was the currency of Finland from 1860 until 28 February 2002, when it ceased to be legal tender. The markka was divided into 100 pennies, abbreviated as "p". At the point of conversion, the rate was fixed at €1 = Mk 5.94573.

The markka was replaced by the euro (€), which had been introduced, in cash form, on 1 January 2002. This was after a transitional period of three years, when the euro was the official currency but only existed as "book money" outside of the monetary base. The dual circulation period, when both the markka and the euro had legal tender status, ended on 28 February 2002.

Etymology

The name "markka" was based on a medieval unit of weight. Both "markka" and "penni" are similar to words used in Germany for that country's former currency, based on the same etymological roots as the Deutsche Mark and pfennig.

Although the word "markka" predates the currency by several centuries, the currency was established before being named "markka". A competition was held for its name, and some of the other entries included "sataikko" (meaning "having a hundred parts"), "omena" (apple) and "suomo" (from "Suomi", the Finnish name for Finland).

With numbered amounts of markkaa, the Finnish language does not use plurals but partitive singular forms: "10 markkaa" and "10 penniä" (the nominative is penni). In Swedish, the singular and plural forms of "mark" and "penni" are the same.

Nicknames
When the euro replaced the markka, mummonmarkka (sometimes shortened to just mummo) became a new colloquial term for the old currency. The sometimes used "old markka" can be misleading, since it can also be used to refer to the pre-1963 markka. In Helsinki slang, the sum of a hundred markkaa was traditionally called a huge [hu.ge] (from Swedish hundra for "hundred"). After the 1963 reform, this name was used for one new markka.

History

The markka was introduced in 1860 by the Bank of Finland, replacing the Russian ruble at a rate of four markkaa to one ruble. Senator Fabian Langenskiöld is called "father of the markka". In 1865, the markka was separated from the ruble and tied to the value of silver. From 1878 to 1915, Finland adopted the gold standard of the Latin Monetary Union. Before the markka, both the Swedish riksdaler and ruble were used side-by-side for a time.

Up until World War I, the value of the markka fluctuated within +23%/−16% of its initial value, but with no trend. The markka suffered heavy inflation (91%) during 1914–18. Gaining independence in 1917, Finland returned to the gold standard from 1926 to 1931. While prices remained stable until 1940, the markka suffered heavy inflation (17% annually on average) during World War II and again in 1956–57 (11%). In 1963, in order to reset the inflation, the markka was redenominated and replaced by a new markka worth 100 old markkaa.

Finland joined the Bretton Woods Agreement in 1948. The value of the markka was pegged to the dollar at Mk 320 = US$1, which became New Mk 3.20 = US$1 in 1963 and devalued to Mk 4.20 = US$1 in 1967. After the breakdown of the Bretton Woods agreement in 1971, a basket of currencies became the new reference. Inflation was high (over 5%) during 1971–85. Occasionally, devaluation was used, 60% in total between 1975 and 1990, allowing the currency to more closely follow the depreciating US dollar than the rising German mark. The paper industry, which mainly traded in US dollars, was often blamed for demanding these devaluations to boost their exports. Various economic controls were removed and the market was gradually liberalized throughout the 1980s and the 1990s.

The monetary policy called "strong markka policy" (vahvan markan politiikka) was a characteristic feature of the 1980s and early 1990s. The main architect of this policy was President Mauno Koivisto, who opposed floating the currency and devaluations. As a result, the nominal value of the markka was extremely high, and in the year 1990, Finland was nominally the most expensive country in the world according to OECD's Purchasing Power Parities report.

Koivisto's policy was maintained only briefly after Esko Aho was elected Prime Minister. In 1991, the markka was pegged to the currency basket ECU, but the peg had to be withdrawn after two months with a devaluation of 12%. In 1992, Finland was hit by a severe recession, the early 1990s depression in Finland. It was caused by several factors, the most severe being the incurring of debt, as the 1980s economic boom was based on debt. Also, the Soviet Union had collapsed, which brought an end to bilateral trade, and existing trade connections were severed. The most important source of export revenue, Western markets, were also depressed during the same time, in part due to the war in Kuwait. As a result, by some opinions years overdue, the artificial fixed exchange rate was abandoned and the markka was floated. Its value immediately decreased 13% and the inflated nominal prices converged towards German levels. In total, the value of the markka had decreased 40% as a result of the recession. Also, as a result, several entrepreneurs who had borrowed money denominated in foreign currency suddenly faced insurmountable debt.

Inflation was low during the markka's independent existence as a floating currency (1992–1999): 1.3% annually on average. The markka was added into the ERM system in 1996 and then became a fraction of the euro in 1999, with physical euro money arriving later in 2002. It has been speculated that if Finland had not joined the euro, market fluctuations such as the dot-com bubble would have reflected as wild fluctuations in the price of the markka. Nokia, formerly traded in markka, was in 2000 the European company with the highest market capitalization.

Coins

First markka 
When the markka was introduced, coins were minted in copper (1, 5 and 10 penniä), silver (25p and 50p, Mk 1 and Mk 2) and gold (Mk 10 and Mk 20). After the First World War, silver and gold issues were ceased and cupro-nickel 25p and 50p and Mk 1 coins were introduced in 1921, followed by aluminium-bronze Mk 5, Mk 10 and Mk 20 between 1928 and 1931. During the Second World War, copper replaced cupro-nickel in the 25p and 50p and Mk 1, followed by an issue of iron 10p, 25p and 50p and Mk 1. This period also saw the issue of holed 5p and 10p coins.

All coins below 1 markka had ceased to be produced by 1948. In 1952, a new coinage was introduced, with smaller iron (later nickel-plated) Mk 1 and Mk 5 coins alongside aluminium-bronze Mk 10, Mk 20 and Mk 50 coins and (from 1956) silver Mk 100 and Mk 200 denominations. This coinage continued to be issued until the introduction of the new markka in 1963.

Second markka 
The old coins and banknotes were exchanged to new ones at 100:1 rate.

First series 
The new markka coinage consisted initially of six denominations: 1 (bronze, later aluminium), 5 (bronze, later aluminium), 10 (aluminium-bronze, later aluminium), 20 and 50 penniä (aluminium-bronze) and 1 markka (silver, later cupro-nickel). The design of new coins (1963) was identical to those of the last issue of the old markka but with new denominations (i.e. 1 penni instead of 1 markka, etc.).

From 1972, aluminium-bronze Mk 5 were also issued.

Second series 

The last series of Finnish markka coins included five coins (listed with final euro values, rounded to the nearest cent):
 10p (silver-coloured) – a honeycomb on the reverse and a lily of the valley flower on the obverse = €0.02
 50p (silver-coloured) – haircap moss on the reverse and a bear on the obverse = €0.08
 Mk 1 (copper-coloured) – the Finnish coat of arms on the reverse = €0.17
 Mk 5 (copper-coloured) – a lily pad leaf and a dragonfly on the reverse and a Saimaa seal on the obverse = €0.84
 Mk 10 (two-metal coin, copper-coloured centre and silver-coloured edge) – rowan tree branches and berries on the reverse and a wood grouse on the obverse = €1.68

Banknotes 
This section covers the last design series of the Finnish markka, designed in the 1980s by Torsten Ekström and Finnish designer Erik Bruun and issued in 1986.

In this final banknote series, the Bank of Finland used a photograph of Väinö Linna on the Mk 20 note without permission from copyright holders. This was only revealed after several million notes were in use. The Bank paid Mk 100,000 (€17,000) compensation to the rights holders.

The second-to-last banknote design series, designed by Tapio Wirkkala, was introduced in 1955 and revised in the reform of 1963. It was the first series to depict actual specific persons rather than allegorical figures. These included Juho Kusti Paasikivi on the Mk 10, K. J. Ståhlberg on the Mk 50, J. V. Snellman on the Mk 100 and, controversially, Urho Kekkonen on the Mk 500, added in 1975 to commemorate the president's 75th birthday. Unlike Erik Bruun's series, this series did not depict any other real-life subjects, but only abstract ornaments in addition to the depictions of people. A popular joke at the time was to cover Paasikivi's face except for his ear and back of the head on the Mk 10 note, ending up with something resembling a mouse, said to be the only animal illustration in the entire series.

The still-older notes, designed by Eliel Saarinen, were introduced in 1922. They also depicted people, but these were generic men and women, and did not represent any specific individuals. The fact that these men and women were depicted nude caused a minor controversy at the time.

Euro banknotes 
By the end of 2001, Finland was a relatively cashless society. Most transactions were paid either using the Mk 100 banknote or by debit card. There were 4 million banknotes apiece of the Mk 500 and Mk 1,000 denomination banknotes for a country with a population of over 5 million people. There were about 19 banknotes per individual of the smaller denomination, adding up to €241 per inhabitant. For the introduction of the euro, ECB produced €8,020 million in banknotes before the changeover.

During the first weeks of 2002, Finland's replacement of previous national banknotes with euro banknotes was among the fastest in the euro area. Of the cash payments, three-fourths were paid in euro already at the end of the first changeover week. Coins and banknotes that were legal tender at the time of the markka's retirement could be exchanged for euros until 29 February 2012. Today, the only value that markka coins and banknotes have is their value as collectibles.

See also 
 Bank of Finland
 Scandinavian Monetary Union
 Finnish euro coins
 Economy of Finland

References

External links
 Overview of markka from the BBC
 Historical Finnish banknotes and coins at the Bank of Finland
 Main outlines of Finnish history-thisisFINLAND
 History of the Finnish Markka (1860–2002)
 Historical banknotes from Finland 

Markka
Modern obsolete currencies
Currencies replaced by the euro
Currencies of Europe
Markka
Markka
Currencies introduced in 1860